It's Love I'm After is a 1937 American screwball comedy film directed by Archie Mayo and starring Leslie Howard, Bette Davis, and Olivia de Havilland. Based on the story "Gentlemen After Midnight" by Maurice Hanline, with a screenplay by Casey Robinson, the film is about a couple who have postponed their marriage eleven times and who continue to plot and scheme their way to marriage. The film marked the third on-screen pairing of Leslie Howard and Bette Davis, following Of Human Bondage and The Petrified Forest.

Plot
Basil Underwood and Joyce Arden are an egotistical acting team known for their romantic scenes on stage and fiery temperaments off. Although they deeply love each other, their frequent spats over the years have kept them from tying the knot.

Comic complications ensue when Basil postpones their latest marriage plans in order to attempt to diminish the ardor of star-struck heiress Marcia West at the request of her fiancé Henry Grant. When Basil's boorish behavior fails to bother Marcia, who is all-too-willing to submit to his charms, he begins to capitalize on her infatuation with him, much to Joyce's dismay.

The screenplay allows Leslie Howard to draw on his classical background by having his character quote lines from Macbeth, Hamlet, The Taming of the Shrew, As You Like It, and Romeo and Juliet.

Cast
 Leslie Howard as Basil Underwood
 Bette Davis as Joyce Arden
 Olivia de Havilland as Marcia West
 Patric Knowles as Henry Grant, Jr.
 Eric Blore as Digges
 George Barbier as William West
 Bonita Granville as Gracie Kane
 Spring Byington as Aunt Ella Paisley
 Georgia Caine as Mrs. Kane (as Georgia Craine)
 Veda Ann Borg as Elsie
 E. E. Clive as First Butler
 Valerie Bergere as Joyce's Maid
 Sarah Edwards as Mrs. Hinkle
 Thomas Pogue as Mr. Hinkle
 Grace Field as Mrs. Babson (as Grace Fields)
 Harvey Clark as Mr. Babson
 Edmund Mortimer as Mr. Kane (as Ed Mortimer)
 Thomas R. Mills as Second Butler (as Thomas Mills) 
 Irving Bacon as Elevator Operator (uncredited)

Production
Leslie Howard originally envisioned either Gertrude Lawrence or Ina Claire, both noted for their comedic stage performances, as his leading lady, although they had limited experience in films. Producer Hal B. Wallis had director Archie Mayo meet with Lawrence, who was interested in playing the role, but when Wallis and Howard screened the 1936 British film Men Are Not Gods, they agreed Lawrence did not photograph well.

The film began production without a leading lady. Then Wallis decided the screwball comedy would be a refreshing change-of-pace for Bette Davis, who had just completed the melodrama That Certain Woman. She initially declined the role of Joyce Arden, feeling the better female role was that of socialite Marcia West. She also resented being asked to accept second billing to Howard. Suffering from exhaustion, Davis went to Palm Springs to recuperate and finally agreed to appear in the film if Wallis would allow her some time for rest and relaxation. He insisted she report to work on March 28, 1937, and she replied, "Give me a week more . . . I must have a brief chance of being something more than a jittery old woman." She also asked Wallis to replace cinematographer James Van Trees with Tony Gaudio, one of the few cameramen she trusted, and the producer agreed, although Van Trees received sole screen credit.

Reception
Time described the film as "refreshing, impudent fun: a buoyant cinema making faces at its precise old aunt, the theatre."

In his review in Allmovie, Craig Butler called the film "unjustly neglected" and "a delightful romp that provides an excellent showcase for the often equally neglected comedic talents of its trio of stars. While Love falls just shy of true classic status - the screenplay is slightly off the mark in a few places and its dialogue occasionally lacks the effervescent sparkle that is a requirement of the genre - it's still a little gem of a picture with an abundance of laughs . . . a great pick-me-up and well worth searching out."

Channel 4 called the film "fast-moving and thoroughly enjoyable."

Musical adaptation
It's Love I'm After is the basis of a stage musical comedy called Madly in Love, which interpolates songs by Vernon Duke with lyrics by Ira Gershwin, E.Y. Harburg, John LaTouche, Sammy Cahn, Ted Fetter, Martin Charnin, and Howard Dietz. Staged readings of the show have been presented by the Goodspeed Opera Company in East Haddam, Connecticut and the York Theater Company in New York City. A demo recording of the score features Karen Ziemba as Joyce Arden, Jay O. Sanders as Jeffrey Underwood, Brent Barrett as Henry Grant, Jr., and Stuart Zagnit as Digges.

References

External links 
 
 
 
 

1937 films
1937 romantic comedy films
American black-and-white films
American romantic comedy films
American screwball comedy films
Films about actors
Films based on short fiction
Films directed by Archie Mayo
Films scored by Heinz Roemheld
Warner Bros. films
1930s English-language films
1930s American films